John Armistead Wilson CBE (November 2, 1879 – October 10, 1954) was a Scottish-born Canadian engineer and aviation pioneer. Along with Major Clare C. MacLaurin, he was responsible for the formulation of Canada's aviation policy following the First World War. He has been dubbed "The Father of Canadian Civil Aviation".

Biography 
Wilson was appointed Secretary of the Air Board in 1920, Assistant Director and Secretary of the Royal Canadian Air Force in 1923, Controller of Civil Aviation in 1927 and Director of Air Services in 1941. He retired from public service in 1945.

For his services during the Second World War, Wilson was appointed a CBE in 1945 and was decorated by Norway. He received the Julian C. Smith Memorial Medal of the Engineering Institute of Canada in 1944 and the Trans-Canada Trophy the same year.

His son John Tuzo Wilson was a prominent geophysicist and geologist.

References 

 https://cahf.ca/john-armistead-wilson/
 https://legionmagazine.com/en/2005/03/fathering-civil-aviation/
 https://www.thecanadianencyclopedia.ca/en/article/john-armistead-wilson
 https://www.archeion.ca/j-wilson-fonds

1879 births
1954 deaths
British emigrants to Canada
Canadian Commanders of the Order of the British Empire
20th-century Canadian engineers
Canadian Aviation Hall of Fame inductees
20th-century Canadian civil servants
Canadian Army officers
Governor General's Foot Guards